The Perfect Life is a 2011 Italian comedy film directed by Lucio Pellegrini. It was screened out of competition at the 2011 Montreal World Film Festival.

Cast 
Pierfrancesco Favino: Mario
Stefano Accorsi: Luca
Vittoria Puccini: Ginevra
Camilla Filippi: Elsa
Ivano Marescotti: Sergio
Angelo Orlando: Salvatore
Djibril Kébé: Thomas

See also   
 List of Italian films of 2011

References

External links

2011 films
Italian comedy films
2011 comedy films
Films directed by Lucio Pellegrini
2010s Italian films
Fandango (Italian company) films